Robert Awdry  (20 May 1881 – 3 February 1949) was an English cricketer who later became chairman of Wiltshire County Council. He played nine first-class matches for Oxford University Cricket Club between 1902 and 1904.

The third son of Charles Awdry of Shaw Hill House, Melksham, and afterwards of the Manor, Littleton Panell, he was educated at Winchester College and New College, Oxford. He served in the Royal Wiltshire Yeomanry through World War I, and after the war rose to the rank of lieutenant colonel commanding the regiment.

He was High Sheriff of Wiltshire in 1928. He was a member of Wiltshire County Council 1919–49 and its chairman 1946–49. He was appointed CBE in the 1946 New Year Honours in recognition of his role as chairman of the council's Emergency Committee.

Awdry was captain of Wiltshire County Cricket Club for several years, and served as President and later Chairman of Wiltshire Archaeological and Natural History Society from 1939 until his death.

Awdrey married Olive Muriel Tosswill in 1913 and they had one daughter. In 1920, Olive was appointed MBE for services to Wiltshire Women's County Agricultural Committee. Awdry had Hawkswell House built at Little Cheverell, Wiltshire around 1914–1920, and lived there until 1941.

See also
 List of Oxford University Cricket Club players

References

External links
 

1881 births
1949 deaths
English cricketers
Oxford University cricketers
Sportspeople from Kensington
Cricketers from Greater London
People educated at Winchester College
Alumni of New College, Oxford
Royal Wiltshire Yeomanry officers
British Army personnel of World War I
High Sheriffs of Wiltshire
Members of Wiltshire County Council
Wiltshire cricketers